Skorvetangen Spur is a rock spur 2 nautical miles (3.7 km) southeast of Hamarskorvene Bluff in the Muhlig-Hofmann Mountains, Queen Maud Land. Mapped by Norwegian cartographers from surveys and air photos by the Norwegian Antarctic Expedition (1956–60) and named Skorvetangen.

See also
Urvantsev Rocks

Ridges of Queen Maud Land
Princess Astrid Coast